WECR (1130 AM) is a radio station broadcasting an adult contemporary format. Licensed to Newland, NC, United States, it serves the Boone, NC area.  The station is currently owned by Curtis Media Group. WECR broadcasts during the daytime only.

History
James T. Parker owned what was then called WJTP.

Steve Rondinaro's Rondinaro Broadcasting purchased WJTP in 1996 and changed the letters to WECR. Rondinaro also started WECR-FM and added WXIT. Aisling bought these stations from Rondinaro as well as WATA and WZJS, owned by Highland Communications. Aisling went into receivership and George Reed of Media Services Group was appointed to manage the stations until a buyer was found. Later in the year, Curtis Media Group purchased the stations.

On January 10, 2022, WECR changed their format from southern gospel to adult contemporary, branded as "Star 94.3" (simulcast on FM translator W232CW 94.3 FM Boone).

References

External links
official website

Mainstream adult contemporary radio stations in the United States
ECR
ECR